Manuel Lassala San Germán (1738–1806) was a Spanish Jesuit dramatist and humanist philosopher.

1738 births
1806 deaths
18th-century Spanish Jesuits
Spanish dramatists and playwrights
Spanish male dramatists and playwrights
Spanish philosophers